= Autovía A-403 =

Highway in Andalusia, Spain

The Autovía A-403 is a highway in Spain. It passes through Andalusia.
